Karl Olsson (born 19 November 1981) is a Swedish sport shooter.

He participated at the 2018 ISSF World Shooting Championships, winning a medal.

References

External links

Living people
1981 births
Swedish male sport shooters
ISSF rifle shooters
20th-century Swedish people
21st-century Swedish people